Unione Sportiva Paolana is an Italian association football club located in Paola, Calabria. It plays in the Eccellenza Calabria. Its colors are all-blue.

References

External links
 Official site

Association football clubs established in 1922
Football clubs in Calabria
1922 establishments in Italy